Bert Cody Piggott (March 5, 1920 – January 10, 1999) was an American football player and coach. He served as the head football coach at North Carolina A&T University from 1957 to 1967, compiling a record of 56–39–4.  Piggott played college football at the University of Illinois.

References

External links
 

1920 births
1999 deaths
American football running backs
Illinois Fighting Illini football players
Los Angeles Dons players
North Carolina A&T Aggies athletic directors
North Carolina A&T Aggies football coaches
People from Hinsdale, Illinois
Players of American football from Illinois